Takelma  was the language spoken by the Latgawa and Takelma people and Cow Creek band of Upper Umpqua. It was first extensively described by Edward Sapir in his graduate thesis, The Takelma Language of Southwestern Oregon. The last fluent speaker of Takelma, with whom Sapir worked while writing about the language, was Frances Johnson (Gwísgwashãn). A dictionary from English to Takelma is currently being created in the hopes it can be revived.

Dialects
Latgawa dialect, spoken in southwestern Oregon along the upper Rogue River
Lowland (Takelma) dialect, spoken in southwestern Oregon in the Rogue Valley
There was possibly a Cow Creek dialect spoken in southwestern Oregon along the South Umpqua River, Myrtle Creek, and Cow Creek.

Genealogical relations
Takelma is commonly included in the controversial Penutian macro-family, as first suggested by Edward Sapir.

Within Penutian, Takelma has been grouped together with the Kalapuyan languages in a "Takelma–Kalapuyan" or "Takelman" language family. However, an unpublished paper by Tarpent & Kendall (1998) finds this relationship to be unfounded because of the extremely different morphological structures of Takelma and Kalapuyan. DeLancey follows this position.

Phonology

Consonants

The consonant phonemes as described by Sapir are:

Vowels 
The vowel system of the Takelma language comprises the six vowels /a e i o u ʉ/, as well as their lengthened counterparts /aː eː iː oː uː ʉː/.

Tones 
Three tones are noted as /v́/, /v̀/, and /v/.

Grammar
Takelma, like many Native American languages, is polysynthetic meaning that one can link together many different morphemes to form a word. Therefore one single word can often contain a lot of information that in English would be portrayed in a full sentence. This is mainly done by adding affixes to verbs.

Tense

Takelma has 6 different tenses listed below with the first (aorist) being the basic tense which is equivalent to the immediate future, present, and past. 
 Aorist
 Potential 
 Future 
 Inferential
 Present Imperative
 Future Imperative

Person and possession

In Takelma, possession is marked by a set of affixes. Most of them are suffixes but there is one prefix. Below is a table of the four declensional sets.

Set I is only ever used with terms of kinship. For example:

Set II is used with bare stems or stems having the formant. For example:

                           

Alternations between –t and –tʰ in set II and set IV is regular and predictable.

Set III is used with stems having other formants. For example:

     
Set IV is used in locative constructions. For example:

versus  

          

versus

wa-té
‘to me’

Object markers

Takelma has a complex system of verbal pronominal suffixes and is also accompanied by the loss of case markers on nouns. This represents a complete shift to full head marking. In the 3rd person object marker in Takelma, the suffix –kʰwa which is realized on the verb. However the distribution of –kʰwa is very restricted.

Here is the full set of object markers:

	

For the 1st and 2nd person objects overt marking is required with clear difference between singular and plural. For 3rd person there is no difference between singular and plural and there is also alternation between the suffix –kʰwa and zero suffix. 
 
The zero variant occurs with animates as well as inanimate, covert pronouns, and overt nominals.

However –kʰwa occurs in three distinct environments. First, when the subject is also 3rd person. Second, it is always used when the object is higher in animacy than the subject. This means that the object refers to a human also a mythic animal that is thought of as a human being.  The third situation is when the subject and object are of equal animacy but the object outranks the subject in topicality.

Words

References

Further reading 

Comparative vocabulary of the languages spoken by the 'Umpqua,' 'Lower Rogue River' [Takelma] and 'Calapooia' tribes of Indians" (35 pp., original dated May 1859), California Language Archive
OLAC resources in and about the Takelma language

L
Penutian languages
Indigenous languages of Oregon
Indigenous languages of the Pacific Northwest Coast
Extinct languages of North America
Northwest Coast Sprachbund (North America)
Language isolates of North America
Languages extinct in the 1930s
1934 disestablishments in Oregon